Landsdelsserien is a former division in Norwegian football and from 1951 to 1962, it was the second tier division in the Norwegian football league system. Following the creation of the new 1. divisjon in 1963, the division folded and its district groups were replaced by national groups in the new second tier; 2. divisjon.

History
Landsdelsserien consisted of seven district groups of seven or eight team in each group. The two winners of the groups from Eastern Norway were promoted directly to the following season's top division, at the time named Hovedserien (English: The Main League). The remaining five winner qualified for promotion play-offs to compete for two spots in the following season's top division. In the 1961–62 season, only two teams promoted. Teams from Northern Norway did not participate in the national league system until 1972 and thus did not participate in Landsdelsserien.

Competition format

Landsdelsserien winners

Winners from districts east/south and east/north were promoted to the top division. The remaining five winner qualified for promotion play-offs to compete for two spots in the following season's top division. In the 1961–62 season, only two teams promoted. Promoted teams are shown in bold.

References

External links

Nor